The French submarine Espadon was a  built for the French Navy in the mid-1920s. Laid down in October 1923, it was launched in May 1926 and commissioned in December 1927. It was disarmed at Bizerte, Tunisia in April 1941 and captured there by Italian forces on 8 December 1942 and renamed FR 114. It was scuttled by the Italians at the Castellamare shipyard on 13 September 1943, then raised by the Germans in 1943 but not repaired.

Design
Propulsion while surfaced was provided by two  diesel motors and two  electric motors.

Citations

References 

World War II submarines of France
Requin-class submarines